McDonald Peak, elevation , is located in the U.S. state of Montana and is the highest peak in the Mission Mountains. McDonald Peak is situated within the Flathead Indian Reservation. McDonald Glacier is on the north slope of the peak.

During the summer the summit and surrounding area are inhabited by grizzly bears for the purpose of feeding on insects. Consequently, in the interests of conservation and safety, the area is closed to hikers between July 15 and September 30.

See also
 List of mountain peaks of North America
 List of mountain peaks of the United States
 List of Ultras of the United States

References

McDonald Peak
Geography of Lake County, Montana